Gardener is a surname. Notable people with the surname include:

Daryl Gardener (born 1973), US football player
Helen H. Gardener (1853–1925), US writer and activist
Jason Gardener (born 1975), English sprinter
John Gardener (disambiguation)
Mark Gardener (born 1969), English musician
Martha Gardener, Australian broadcaster
Nico Gardener (1908–1989), British bridge player
Nicola Gardener (born 1949), British bridge player
Thomas Gardener (died 1408/9), English politician
Walson Gardener (born 1932), US NASCAR driver

See also
Gardner (surname)
Gardiner (surname)
Gartner (surname)